Kushanshah (Bactrian: KΟÞANΟ ÞAΟ, Koshano Shao, Pahlavi: Kwšan MLK Kushan Malik) was the title of the rulers of the Kushano-Sasanian Kingdom, the parts of the former Kushan Empire in the areas of Sogdiana, Bactria and Gandhara, named Kushanshahr and held by the Sasanian Empire, during the 3rd and 4th centuries CE. They are collectively known as Kushano-Sasanians, or Indo-Sasanians.

The Kushanshahs minted their own coinage, and took the title of Kushanshas, ie "Kings of the Kushans". This administration continued until 360 CE. The Kushanshas are mainly known through their coins.

A rebellion of Hormizd I Kushanshah (277-286 CE), who issued coins with the title Kushanshahanshah (KΟÞANΟ ÞAΟNΟNΟ ÞAΟ "King of kings of the Kushans"), seems to have occurred against contemporary emperor Bahram II (276-293 CE) of the Sasanian Empire, but failed.

The title is first attested in the Paikuli inscription of the Sasanian shah Narseh in ca. 293, where it functioned as a title for the Sasanian governors of the eastern portion of the empire. The title was also used by the Kidarite dynasty, which was the last kingdom to make use of it.

Main Kushanshahs
The following Kushanshahs were:

 Ardashir I Kushanshah (230–245)
 Peroz I Kushanshah (245–275)
 Hormizd I Kushanshah (275–300)
 Hormizd II Kushanshah (300–303)
 Peroz II Kushanshah (303–330)
 Varahran I Kushanshah (330-365)

References

Sources 
  
 
 
  
 
  
 
 
 
 

Iranian words and phrases

Royal titles